Denzil Kenan Sequeira (born March 27, 1990 in India) is an Indian-born Botswana cricketer and currently plays for the Botswana national cricket team.

References

External links 

 Cricketarchive
 Cricinfo

1990 births
Living people
Botswana cricketers
Indian emigrants to Botswana
Wicket-keepers